Maliheh may refer to:
 Maliheh 1 (disambiguation)
 Maliheh 2
 Maliheh Kut-e Sad
 Maliheh Olumi
 Maliheh-ye Hajj Badr
 Maliheh-ye Sadun
  Maliheh-ye Sharqi